Acanthophila nyingchiensis is a moth in the family Gelechiidae. It is found in China (Xizang).

References

nyingchiensis
Moths described in 1996
Moths of Asia